Atteva flavivitta is a moth of the family Attevidae. It is only known from Isla Margarita in Venezuela.

External links
A review of the New World Atteva (Walker) moths (Yponomeutidae, Attevinae)

Attevidae
Invertebrates of Venezuela
Moths described in 1866